Mugudzyrkhva Church is a ruined medieval church near the village of Mugudzirkhva, Gudauta municipality, Abkhazia, an entity in the South Caucasus with a disputed political status. 

The ruins stand on a rocky hill in the Mchishta ravine. The ruined church was a hall-church design, its more or less preserved northern wall faced with limestone slabs. There are the remains of pilasters which once supported arches of the vault. The eastern wall with a protruding apse and the southern wall are almost completely ruined. Numerous shivers of roof tiles are scattered around the edifice.

References

External links 
Mugudzirkhva Church. Historical monuments of Abkhazia — Government of the Autonomous Republic of Abkhazia. 

Religious buildings and structures in Georgia (country)
Religious buildings and structures in Abkhazia
Churches in Abkhazia